The Amsterdam Tournament  is a pre-season football tournament held for club teams from around the world, hosted at the Amsterdam ArenA. The 2002 tournament was contested by Ajax, Barcelona, Manchester United and Parma on 2 August and 4 August 2002. Ajax won the tournament for the second year in a row.

Table

NB: An extra point is awarded for each goal scored.

Matches

Day 1

Day 2

References

2002 
2002–03 in Dutch football
2002–03 in Italian football
2002–03 in Spanish football
2002–03 in English football